The 2017–18 Santa Clara Broncos men's basketball team represented Santa Clara University during the 2017–18 NCAA Division I men's basketball season. The Broncos were led by second-year head coach Herb Sendek and played their home games at the Leavey Center as members of the West Coast Conference. They finished the season 11–20, 8–10 in WCC play to finish in seventh place. They lost in the first round of the WCC tournament to Pepperdine.

Previous season
The Broncos finished the 2016–17 season 17–16, 10–8 in WCC play to finish in a tie for fourth place. They defeated San Francisco in the WCC tournament before losing in the semifinals to Gonzaga.

Departures

Incoming Transfers

Recruiting

Roster

Schedule and results

|-
!colspan=9 style=| Exhibition

|-
!colspan=9 style=| Non-conference regular season

|-
!colspan=9 style=| WCC regular season

|-
!colspan=9 style=| WCC tournament

References

Santa Clara Broncos men's basketball seasons
Santa Clara
Santa Clara
Santa Clara